The Isokyrö railway station is a closed station located in the municipality of Isokyrö, Finland, in the village of Orismala. It was located along the Seinäjoki–Vaasa railway, and its neighboring stations at the time of closing were Ylistaro in the east and Tervajoki in the west.

History 
Isokyrö was opened under the name of Orismala at the same time as the rest of the Seinäjoki–Vaasa line, on 29 September 1883. It was established in the crossing between the railway and the road from the Isokyrö Church to the Orisberg Manor, being named after the latter. Being founded as a pysäkki, it was promoted to a class V station in 1888. A small village formed around the station, and as the former Isokyrö railway station became an unmanned halt under the name of Ventälä, Orismala was granted the name of the municipality instead. The new Isokyrö in turn became unmanned in 1989.

Isokyrö remained as a passenger station until 20 June 2016, when it was closed along with Laihia and Ylistaro. VR claims that the closures will allow travel times to be cut by an average of 6 minutes from Vaasa to Seinäjoki and 19 minutes from Vaasa to Helsinki. The company then established a replacement bus service to serve the surroundings the closed stations. This made Tervajoki the only intermediate station used by the InterCity trains between Seinäjoki and Vaasa. Its three-track rail yard remains in use as one of the two passing loops on the section. The cross-platform level crossing was dismantled upon the station's closing, however, which allowed the removal of a speed limit restriction around the station.

Architecture 
The station building was constructed according to stock blueprints from for the stations on the Vaasa line; it was later expanded with plans from Bruno Granholm. The premises also included a two-spot roundhouse, which was dismantled in 1922. The station building and its related buildings were transferred under the ownership of Senate Properties and put up for sale in 2007.

External links 
 
 Connecting buses on VR.fi

References 

Isokyrö
Railway stations opened in 1883
Railway stations closed in 2016
Railway stations in South Ostrobothnia
Defunct railway stations in Finland